The 63rd United States Congress was a meeting of the legislative branch of the United States federal government, composed of the United States Senate and the United States House of Representatives. It met in Washington, D.C. from March 4, 1913, to March 4, 1915, during the first two years of Woodrow Wilson's presidency. The apportionment of seats in the House of Representatives was based on the 1910 United States census.

The Democrats had greatly increased their majority in the House, and won control of the Senate, giving them full control of Congress for the first time since the 53rd Congress in 1893.  With Woodrow Wilson being sworn in as president on March 4, 1913, this gave the Democrats an overall federal government trifecta - also for the first time since the 53rd Congress.

Major events
 

March 4, 1913: Woodrow Wilson became President of the United States.
March 9, 1914: The Senate adopted a rule forbidding smoking on the floor of the Senate because Senator Ben Tillman, recovering from a stroke, found the smoke irritating.
 July 28, 1914: World War I began in Europe
 August 15, 1914: The Panama Canal was inaugurated
 August 19, 1914: President Woodrow Wilson declared strict U.S. neutrality
 November 1914: United States House of Representatives elections, 1914 and United States Senate elections, 1914
 November 16, 1914: Federal Reserve Bank opened

Major legislation

 May 27, 1913: Kern Resolution
 July 9, 1913: Saboth Act
 July 15, 1913: Newlands Labor Act
 October 3, 1913: Revenue Act of 1913 (Federal Income Tax), including Underwood Tariff
 October 22, 1913: Urgent Deficiencies Act
 December 19, 1913: Raker Act
 December 23, 1913: Federal Reserve Act, ch. 6, et seq.
 May 8, 1914: Smith–Lever Act, ch. 79, 
 June 24, 1914: Cutter Service Act
 June 30, 1914: Cooperative Funds Act
 July 17, 1914: Agricultural Entry Act
 July 18, 1914: Aviation Service Act
 July 21, 1914: Borland Amendment
 August 13, 1914: Smith–Hayden Act
 August 15, 1914: Sponge Act
 August 18, 1914: Cotton Futures Act of 1914
 August 18, 1914: Foreign Ship Registry Act
 August 22, 1914: Glacier National Park Act of 1914
 September 2, 1914: War Risk Insurance Act (Rayburn Act)
 September 26, 1914: Federal Trade Commission Act, ch. 311, 38 Stat. 717, 
 October 2, 1914: River and Harbors Act of 1914
 October 15, 1914: Clayton Antitrust Act, ch. 323, 38 Stat. 730, et seq.
 October 22, 1914: Emergency Internal Revenue Tax Act
 December 17, 1914: Harrison Narcotics Tax Act
 January 28, 1915: Coast Guard Act
 March 4, 1915: Merchant Marine Act of 1915
 March 4, 1915: River and Harbors Act of 1915
 March 4, 1915: Standard Barrel Act For Fruits, Vegetables, and Dry Commodities
 March 4, 1915: Federal Boiler Inspection Act
 March 4, 1915: Uniform Bill of Lading Act
 March 4, 1915: Occupancy Permits Act

Constitutional amendments 
 April 8, 1913: Seventeenth Amendment to the United States Constitution, establishing the popular election of United States senators by the people of the states, was ratified by the requisite number of states (then 36) to become part of the Constitution

Party summary

Senate

House of Representatives

Leadership

Senate leadership

Presiding
President: Thomas R. Marshall (D)
President pro tempore: James P. Clarke (D)
Majority Whip: J. Hamilton Lewis (D)
Minority Whip: James W. Wadsworth Jr. (R) until March 4; Charles Curtis (R) starting March 4
 Democratic Caucus Chairman: John W. Kern
Republican Conference Chairman: Jacob Harold Gallinger
 Democratic Caucus Secretary: Willard Saulsbury Jr.
 Republican Conference Secretary: William Squire Kenyon

House leadership

Presiding
Speaker: Champ Clark (D)

Majority (Democratic) leadership
Majority Leader: Oscar Underwood
Majority Whip: Thomas M. Bell
 Democratic Caucus Chairman: A. Mitchell Palmer
 Democratic Campaign Committee Chairman: Frank Ellsworth Doremus

Minority (Republican) leadership
Minority Leader: James R. Mann
Minority Whip: Charles H. Burke
 Republican Conference Chairman: William S. Greene
 Republican Campaign Committee Chairman: Frank P. Woods

Members

Skip to House of Representatives, below

Senate

Most senators were elected by the state legislatures every two years, with one-third beginning new six-year terms with each Congress. A few senators were elected directly by the residents of the state. Preceding the names in the list below are Senate class numbers, which indicate the cycle of their election, In this Congress, Class 3 meant their term ended with this Congress, requiring reelection in 1914; Class 1 meant their term began in the last Congress, requiring reelection in 1916; and Class 2 meant their term began in this Congress, requiring reelection in 1918.

Alabama 
 2. John H. Bankhead (D)
 3. Joseph F. Johnston (D), until August 8, 1913
 Frank White (D), from May 11, 1914

Arizona 
 1. Henry F. Ashurst (D)
 3. Marcus A. Smith (D)

Arkansas 
 2. Joseph Robinson (D)
 3. James P. Clarke (D)

California 
 1. John D. Works (R)
 3. George C. Perkins (R)

Colorado 
 2. John F. Shafroth (D)
 3. Charles S. Thomas (D)

Connecticut 
 1. George P. McLean (R)
 3. Frank B. Brandegee (R)

Delaware 
 1. Henry A. du Pont (R)
 2. Willard Saulsbury Jr. (D)

Florida 
 1. Nathan P. Bryan (D)
 3. Duncan U. Fletcher (D)

Georgia 
 2. Augustus O. Bacon (D), until February 14, 1914
 William S. West (D), March 2, 1914 – November 3, 1914
 Thomas W. Hardwick (D), from November 4, 1914
 3. Hoke Smith (D)

Idaho 
 2. William E. Borah (R)
 3. James H. Brady (R)

Illinois 
 2. J. Hamilton Lewis (D), from March 26, 1913
 3. Lawrence Sherman (R), from March 26, 1913

Indiana 
 1. John W. Kern (D)
 3. Benjamin F. Shively (D)

Iowa 
 2. William Squire Kenyon (R)
 3. Albert B. Cummins (R)

Kansas 
 2. William H. Thompson (D)
 3. Joseph L. Bristow (R)

Kentucky 
 2. Ollie M. James (D)
 3. William O. Bradley (R), until May 23, 1914
 Johnson N. Camden Jr. (D), from June 16, 1914

Louisiana 
 2. Joseph E. Ransdell (D)
 3. John R. Thornton (D)

Maine 
 1. Charles Fletcher Johnson (D)
 2. Edwin C. Burleigh (R)

Maryland 
 1. William P. Jackson (R), until January 28, 1914
 Blair Lee (D), from January 28, 1914
 3. John Walter Smith (D)

Massachusetts 
 1. Henry Cabot Lodge (R)
 2. John W. Weeks (R)

Michigan 
 1. Charles E. Townsend (R)
 2. William Alden Smith (R)

Minnesota 
 1. Moses E. Clapp (R)
 2. Knute Nelson (R)

Mississippi 
 1. John Sharp Williams (D)
 2. James K. Vardaman (D)

Missouri 
 1. James A. Reed (D)
 3. William J. Stone (D)

Montana 
 1. Henry L. Myers (D)
 2. Thomas J. Walsh (D)

Nebraska 
 1. Gilbert M. Hitchcock (D)
 2. George W. Norris (R)

Nevada 
 1. Key Pittman (D)
 3. Francis G. Newlands (D)

New Hampshire 
 2. Henry F. Hollis (D), from March 13, 1913
 3. Jacob H. Gallinger (R)

New Jersey 
 1. James E. Martine (D)
 2. William Hughes (D)

New Mexico 
 1. Thomas B. Catron (R)
 2. Albert B. Fall (R)

New York 
 1. James A. O'Gorman (D)
 3. Elihu Root (R)

North Carolina 
 2. Furnifold M. Simmons (D)
 3. Lee S. Overman (D)

North Dakota 
 1. Porter J. McCumber (R)
 3. Asle J. Gronna (R)

Ohio 
 1. Atlee Pomerene (D)
 3. Theodore E. Burton (R)

Oklahoma 
 2. Robert L. Owen (D)
 3. Thomas P. Gore (D)

Oregon 
 2. Harry Lane (D)
 3. George E. Chamberlain (D)

Pennsylvania 
 1. George T. Oliver (R)
 3. Boies Penrose (R)

Rhode Island 
 1. Henry F. Lippitt (R)
 2. LeBaron B. Colt (R)

South Carolina 
 2. Benjamin R. Tillman (D)
 3. Ellison D. Smith (D)

South Dakota 
 2. Thomas Sterling (R)
 3. Coe I. Crawford (R)

Tennessee 
 1. Luke Lea (D)
 2. John K. Shields (D)

Texas 
 1. Charles A. Culberson (D)
 2. Morris Sheppard (D)

Utah 
 1. George Sutherland (R)
 3. Reed Smoot (R)

Vermont 
 1. Carroll S. Page (R)
 3. William P. Dillingham (R)

Virginia 
 1. Claude A. Swanson (D)
 2. Thomas S. Martin (D)

Washington 
 1. Miles Poindexter (Prog.)
 3. Wesley L. Jones (R)

West Virginia 
 1. William E. Chilton (D)
 2. Nathan Goff (R), from April 1, 1913

Wisconsin 
 1. Robert M. La Follette Sr. (R)
 3. Isaac Stephenson (R)

Wyoming 
 1. Clarence D. Clark (R)
 2. Francis E. Warren (R)

House of Representatives

Alabama 
 : John Abercrombie (D)
 . George W. Taylor (D)
 . S. Hubert Dent Jr. (D)
 . Henry D. Clayton (D), until May 25, 1914
 William Oscar Mulkey (D), from June 29, 1914
 . Fred L. Blackmon (D)
 . J. Thomas Heflin (D)
 . Richmond P. Hobson (D)
 . John L. Burnett (D)
 . William N. Richardson (D), until March 31, 1914
 Christopher Columbus Harris (D), from May 11, 1914
 . Oscar W. Underwood (D)

Arizona 
 : Carl Hayden (D)

Arkansas 
 . Thaddeus H. Caraway (D)
 . William A. Oldfield (D)
 . John C. Floyd (D)
 . Otis Wingo (D)
 . Henderson M. Jacoway (D)
 . Samuel M. Taylor (D)
 . William S. Goodwin (D)

California 
 . William Kent (I)
 . John E. Raker (D)
 . Charles F. Curry (R)
 . Julius Kahn (R)
 . John I. Nolan (R)
 . Joseph R. Knowland (R)
 . Denver S. Church (D)
 . Everis A. Hayes (R)
 . Charles W. Bell (Prog.)
 . William Stephens (Prog.)
 . William Kettner (D)

Colorado 
 : Edward T. Taylor (D)
 : Edward Keating (D)
 . George John Kindel (D)
 . Harry Hunter Seldomridge (D)

Connecticut 
 . Augustine Lonergan (D)
 . Bryan F. Mahan (D)
 . Thomas L. Reilly (D)
 . Jeremiah Donovan (D)
 . William Kennedy (D)

Delaware 
 : Franklin Brockson (D)

Florida 
 : Claude L'Engle (D)
 . Stephen M. Sparkman (D)
 . Frank Clark (D)
 . Emmett Wilson (D)

Georgia 
 . Charles G. Edwards (D)
 . Seaborn Roddenbery (D), until September 25, 1913
 Frank Park (D), from November 4, 1913
 . Charles R. Crisp (D)
 . William C. Adamson (D)
 . William S. Howard (D)
 . Charles L. Bartlett (D)
 . Gordon Lee (D)
 . Samuel J. Tribble (D)
 . Thomas Montgomery Bell (D)
 . Thomas W. Hardwick (D), until November 2, 1914
 Carl Vinson (D), from November 3, 1914
 . John R. Walker (D)
 . Dudley M. Hughes (D)

Idaho 
 : Addison T. Smith (R)
 : Burton L. French (R)

Illinois 
 : Lawrence B. Stringer (D)
 : William E. Williams (D)
 . Martin B. Madden (R)
 . James R. Mann (R)
 . George E. Gorman (D)
 . James T. McDermott (D), until July 21, 1914
 . Adolph J. Sabath (D)
 . James McAndrews (D)
 . Frank Buchanan (D)
 . Thomas Gallagher (D)
 . Frederick A. Britten (R)
 . Charles M. Thomson (Prog.)
 . Ira C. Copley (R)
 . William H. Hinebaugh (Prog.)
 . John C. McKenzie (R)
 . Clyde H. Tavenner (D)
 . Stephen A. Hoxworth (D)
 . Claude U. Stone (D)
 . Louis Fitzhenry (D)
 . Frank T. O'Hair (D)
 . Charles M. Borchers (D)
 . Henry T. Rainey (D)
 . James M. Graham (D)
 . William N. Baltz (D)
 . Martin D. Foster (D)
 . H. Robert Fowler (D)
 . Robert P. Hill (D)

Indiana 
 . Charles Lieb (D)
 . William A. Cullop (D)
 . William E. Cox (D)
 . Lincoln Dixon (D)
 . Ralph W. Moss (D)
 . Finly H. Gray (D)
 . Charles A. Korbly (D)
 . John A.M. Adair (D)
 . Martin A. Morrison (D)
 . John B. Peterson (D)
 . George W. Rauch (D)
 . Cyrus Cline (D)
 . Henry A. Barnhart (D)

Iowa 
 . Charles A. Kennedy (R)
 . Irvin S. Pepper (D), until December 22, 1913
 Henry Vollmer (D), from February 10, 1914
 . Maurice Connolly (D)
 . Gilbert N. Haugen (R)
 . James W. Good (R)
 . Sanford Kirkpatrick (D)
 . Solomon F. Prouty (R)
 . Horace M. Towner (R)
 . William R. Green (R)
 . Frank P. Woods (R)
 . George Cromwell Scott (R)

Kansas 
 . Daniel Read Anthony Jr. (R)
 . Joseph Taggart (D)
 . Philip P. Campbell (R)
 . Dudley Doolittle (D)
 . Guy T. Helvering (D)
 . John R. Connelly (D)
 . George A. Neeley (D)
 . Victor Murdock (R)

Kentucky 
 . Alben Barkley (D)
 . Augustus Stanley (D)
 . Robert Y. Thomas Jr. (D)
 . Ben Johnson (D)
 . J. Swagar Sherley (D)
 . Arthur B. Rouse (D)
 . J. Campbell Cantrill (D)
 . Harvey Helm (D)
 . William Jason Fields (D)
 . John W. Langley (R)
 . Caleb Powers (R)

Louisiana 
 . Albert Estopinal (D)
 . Henry Garland Dupré (D)
 . Robert Foligny Broussard (D)
 . John Thomas Watkins (D)
 . James Walter Elder (D)
 . Lewis Lovering Morgan (D)
 . Ladislas Lazaro (D)
 . James Benjamin Aswell (D)

Maine 
 . Asher C. Hinds (R)
 . Daniel J. McGillicuddy (D)
 . Forrest Goodwin (R), until May 28, 1913
 John Peters (R), from September 9, 1913
 . Frank E. Guernsey (R)

Maryland 
 . J. Harry Covington (D), until September 30, 1914
 Jesse D. Price (D), from November 3, 1914
 . J. Frederick C. Talbott (D)
 . George Konig (D), until May 31, 1913
 Charles P. Coady (D), from November 4, 1913
 . J. Charles Linthicum (D)
 . Frank Owens Smith (D)
 . David J. Lewis (D)

Massachusetts 
 . Allen T. Treadway (R)
 . Frederick H. Gillett (R)
 . William H. Wilder (R), until September 11, 1913
 Calvin D. Paige (R), from November 4, 1913
 . Samuel E. Winslow (R)
 . John J. Rogers (R)
 . Augustus P. Gardner (R)
 . Michael F. Phelan (D)
 . Frederick S. Deitrick (D)
 . Ernest W. Roberts (R)
 . William F. Murray (D), until September 28, 1914
 . Andrew J. Peters (D), until August 15, 1914
 . James M. Curley (D), until February 4, 1914
 James A. Gallivan (D), from April 7, 1914
 . John W. Weeks (R), until March 4, 1913
 John J. Mitchell (D), from April 15, 1913
 . Edward Gilmore (D)
 . William S. Greene (R)
 . Thomas Chandler Thacher (D)

Michigan 
 : Patrick H. Kelley (R)
 . Frank E. Doremus (D)
 . Samuel Beakes (D)
 . John M. C. Smith (R)
 . Edward L. Hamilton (R)
 . Carl Mapes (R)
 . Samuel W. Smith (R)
 . Louis C. Cramton (R)
 . Joseph W. Fordney (R)
 . James C. McLaughlin (R)
 . Roy O. Woodruff (Prog.)
 . Francis O. Lindquist (R)
 . H. Olin Young (R), until May 16, 1913
 William Josiah MacDonald (Prog.), from August 26, 1913

Minnesota 
 . James Manahan (R)
 . Sydney Anderson (R)
 . Winfield Scott Hammond (D), until January 6, 1915
 . Charles Russell Davis (R)
 . Frederick Stevens (R)
 . George Ross Smith (R)
 . Charles August Lindbergh (R)
 . Andrew Volstead (R)
 . Clarence B. Miller (R)
 . Halvor Steenerson (R)

Mississippi 
 . Ezekiel S. Candler Jr. (D)
 . Hubert D. Stephens (D)
 . Benjamin G. Humphreys II (D)
 . Thomas U. Sisson (D)
 . Samuel Andrew Witherspoon (D)
 . Pat Harrison (D)
 . Percy E. Quin (D)
 . James W. Collier (D)

Missouri 
 . James Tilghman Lloyd (D)
 . William W. Rucker (D)
 . Joshua Willis Alexander (D)
 . Charles F. Booher (D)
 . William Patterson Borland (D)
 . Clement C. Dickinson (D)
 . Courtney W. Hamlin (D)
 . Dorsey W. Shackleford (D)
 . James Beauchamp Clark (D)
 . Richard Bartholdt (R)
 . William Leo Igoe (D)
 . Leonidas C. Dyer (R), until June 19, 1914
 Michael Joseph Gill (D), from June 19, 1914
 . Walter Lewis Hensley (D)
 . Joseph J. Russell (D)
 . Perl D. Decker (D)
 . Thomas L. Rubey (D)

Montana 
 : John M. Evans (D)
 : Tom Stout (D)

Nebraska 
 . John A. Maguire (D)
 . Charles O. Lobeck (D)
 . Dan V. Stephens (D)
 . Charles Henry Sloan (R)
 . Silas Reynolds Barton (R)
 . Moses P. Kinkaid (R)

Nevada 
 : Edwin E. Roberts (R)

New Hampshire 
 . Eugene Elliott Reed (D)
 . Raymond Bartlett Stevens (D)

New Jersey 
 . William J. Browning (R)
 . J. Thompson Baker (D)
 . Thomas J. Scully (D)
 . Allan B. Walsh (D)
 . William E. Tuttle Jr. (D)
 . Lewis J. Martin (D), until May 5, 1913
 Archibald C. Hart (D), from July 22, 1913
 . Robert G. Bremner (D), until February 5, 1914
 Dow H. Drukker (R), from April 7, 1914
 . Eugene F. Kinkead (D), until February 4, 1915
 . Walter I. McCoy (D), until October 3, 1914
 Richard W. Parker (R), from December 1, 1914
 . Edward W. Townsend (D)
 . John J. Eagan (D)
 . James A. Hamill (D)

New Mexico 
 : Harvey B. Fergusson (D)

New York 
 . Lathrop Brown (D)
 . Denis O'Leary (D), until December 31, 1914
 . Frank E. Wilson (D)
 . Harry H. Dale (D)
 . James P. Maher (D)
 . William M. Calder (R)
 . John J. Fitzgerald (D)
 . Daniel J. Griffin (D)
 . James H. O'Brien (D)
 . Herman A. Metz (D)
 . Daniel J. Riordan (D)
 . Henry M. Goldfogle (D)
 . Timothy D. Sullivan (D), until August 31, 1913
 George W. Loft (D), from November 4, 1913
 . Jefferson M. Levy (D)
 . Michael F. Conry (D)
 . Peter J. Dooling (D)
 . John F. Carew (D)
 . Thomas G. Patten (D)
 . Walter M. Chandler (Prog.)
 . Francis B. Harrison (D), until September 1, 1913
 Jacob A. Cantor (D), from November 4, 1913
 . Henry George Jr. (D)
 . Henry Bruckner (D)
 . Joseph A. Goulden (D)
 . Woodson R. Oglesby (D)
 . Benjamin I. Taylor (D)
 . Edmund Platt (R)
 . George McClellan (D)
 . Peter G. Ten Eyck (D)
 . James S. Parker (R)
 . Samuel Wallin (R)
 . Edwin A. Merritt (R), until December 4, 1914
 . Luther W. Mott (R)
 . Charles A. Talcott (D)
 . George W. Fairchild (R)
 . John R. Clancy (D)
 . Sereno E. Payne (R), until December 10, 1914
 . Edwin S. Underhill (D)
 . Thomas B. Dunn (R)
 . Henry G. Danforth (R)
 . Robert H. Gittins (D)
 . Charles B. Smith (D)
 . Daniel A. Driscoll (D)
 . Charles M. Hamilton (R)

North Carolina 
 . John Humphrey Small (D)
 . Claude Kitchin (D)
 . John M. Faison (D)
 . Edward W. Pou (D)
 . Charles M. Stedman (D)
 . Hannibal L. Godwin (D)
 . Robert N. Page (D)
 . Robert L. Doughton (D)
 . Edwin Y. Webb (D)
 . James M. Gudger Jr. (D)

North Dakota 
 . Henry Thomas Helgesen (R)
 . George M. Young (R)
 . Patrick Daniel Norton (R)

Ohio 
 : Robert Crosser (D)
 . Stanley E. Bowdle (D)
 . Alfred G. Allen (D)
 . Warren Gard (D)
 . J. Henry Goeke (D)
 . Timothy T. Ansberry (D), until January 9, 1915
 . Simeon D. Fess (R)
 . James D. Post (D)
 . Frank B. Willis (R), until January 9, 1915
 . Isaac R. Sherwood (D)
 . Robert M. Switzer (R)
 . Horatio C. Claypool (D)
 . Clement L. Brumbaugh (D)
 . John A. Key (D)
 . William G. Sharp (D), until July 23, 1914
 . George White (D)
 . William B. Francis (D)
 . William A. Ashbrook (D)
 . John J. Whitacre (D)
 . Elsworth R. Bathrick (D)
 . William Gordon (D)
 . Robert J. Bulkley (D)

Oklahoma 
 : William H. Murray (D)
 : Joseph Bryan Thompson (D)
 : Claude Weaver (D)
 . Bird Segle McGuire (R)
 . Dick Thompson Morgan (R)
 . James S. Davenport (D)
 . Charles D. Carter (D)
 . Scott Ferris (D)

Oregon 
 . Willis C. Hawley (R)
 . Nicholas J. Sinnott (R)
 . Walter Lafferty (R)

Pennsylvania 
 : Fred E. Lewis (R)
 : John M. Morin (R)
 : Anderson H. Walters (R)
 : Arthur R. Rupley (R)
 . William S. Vare (R)
 . George S. Graham (R)
 . J. Hampton Moore (R)
 . George W. Edmonds (R)
 . Michael Donohoe (D)
 . J. Washington Logue (D)
 . Thomas S. Butler (R)
 . Robert E. Difenderfer (D)
 . William W. Griest (R)
 . John R. Farr (R)
 . John J. Casey (D)
 . Robert Emmett Lee (D)
 . John H. Rothermel (D)
 . William D.B. Ainey (R)'
 . Edgar R. Kiess (R)
 . John V. Lesher (D)
 . Franklin L. Dershem (D)
 . Aaron S. Kreider (R)
 . Warren W. Bailey (D)
 . Andrew R. Brodbeck (D)
 . Charles E. Patton (R)
 . Abraham L. Keister (R)
 . Wooda N. Carr (D)
 . Henry W. Temple (Prog.)
 . Milton W. Shreve (R)
 . A. Mitchell Palmer (D)
 . J. N. Langham (R)
 . Willis J. Hulings (Prog.)
 . Stephen G. Porter (R)
 . M. Clyde Kelly (R)
 . James F. Burke (R)
 . Andrew J. Barchfeld (R)

Rhode Island 
 . George Francis O'Shaunessy (D)
 . Peter Goelet Gerry (D)
 . Ambrose Kennedy (R)

South Carolina 
 . Richard S. Whaley (D), from April 29, 1913
 . James F. Byrnes (D)
 . Wyatt Aiken (D)
 . Joseph T. Johnson (D)
 . David E. Finley (D)
 . J. Willard Ragsdale (D)
 . Asbury F. Lever (D)

South Dakota 
 . Charles H. Dillon (R)
 . Charles H. Burke (R)
 . Eben W. Martin (R)

Tennessee 
 . Sam R. Sells (R)
 . Richard W. Austin (R)
 . John Austin Moon (D)
 . Cordell Hull (D)
 . William C. Houston (D)
 . Joseph W. Byrns (D)
 . Lemuel Phillips Padgett (D)
 . Thetus Willrette Sims (D)
 . Finis J. Garrett (D)
 . Kenneth McKellar (D)

Texas 
 : Daniel E. Garrett (D)
 : Hatton W. Sumners (D)
 . Horace Worth Vaughan (D)
 . Martin Dies (D)
 . James Young (D)
 . Sam Rayburn (D)
 . James Andrew Beall (D)
 . Rufus Hardy (D)
 . Alexander W. Gregg (D)
 . Joe H. Eagle (D)
 . George Farmer Burgess (D)
 . Albert S. Burleson (D), until March 6, 1913
 James P. Buchanan (D), from April 15, 1913
 . Robert L. Henry (D)
 . Oscar Callaway (D)
 . John Hall Stephens (D)
 . James L. Slayden (D)
 . John Nance Garner (D)
 . William R. Smith (D)

Utah 
 : Joseph Howell (R)
 : Jacob Johnson (R)

Vermont 
 . Frank L. Greene (R)
 . Frank Plumley (R)

Virginia 
 . William Atkinson Jones (D)
 . Edward Everett Holland (D)
 . Andrew Jackson Montague (D)
 . Walter Allen Watson (D)
 . Edward W. Saunders (D)
 . Carter Glass (D)
 . James Hay (D)
 . Charles Creighton Carlin (D)
 . C. Bascom Slemp (R)
 . Henry De Flood (D)

Washington 
 : James W. Bryan (Prog.)
 : Jacob Falconer (Prog.)
 . William E. Humphrey (R)
 . Albert Johnson (R)
 . William Leroy La Follette (R)

West Virginia 
 : Howard Sutherland (R)
 . John W. Davis (D), until August 29, 1913
 Matthew M. Neely (D), from October 14, 1913
 . William Gay Brown Jr. (D)
 . Samuel B. Avis (R)
 . Hunter H. Moss Jr. (R)
 . James Anthony Hughes (R)

Wisconsin 
 . Henry Allen Cooper (R)
 . Michael Edmund Burke (D)
 . John M. Nelson (R)
 . William J. Cary (R)
 . William H. Stafford (R)
 . Michael K. Reilly (D)
 . John Jacob Esch (R)
 . Edward E. Browne (R)
 . Thomas Frank Konop (D)
 . James A. Frear (R)
 . Irvine L. Lenroot (R)

Wyoming 
 : Franklin Wheeler Mondell (R)

Non-voting members 
 . James Wickersham (R)
 . Jonah Kuhio Kalanianaole (R)
 . Manuel Earnshaw (Ind.)
 . Manuel L. Quezon (Nac.)
 . Luis Muñoz Rivera (Unionist)

Changes in membership
The count below reflects changes from the beginning of the first session of this Congress.

Senate
 Replacements: 3
 Democratic: 2 seat net gain
 Republican: 2 seat net loss
 Deaths: 3
 Resignations: 3
 Vacancies: 3
 Total seats with changes:  9

House of Representatives
 Replacements: 20
 Democratic: 1 seat gain
 Republican: 2 seat loss
 Progressive: 1 seat gain
 Deaths: 11
 Resignations: 19
 Contested elections: 2
 Total seats with changes: 15

Committees

Senate

 Additional Accommodations for the Library of Congress (Select) (Chairman: Boies Penrose; Ranking Member: William J. Stone)
 Agriculture and Forestry (Chairman: Thomas P. Gore; Ranking Member: Francis E. Warren)
 Appropriations (Chairman: Thomas S. Martin; Ranking Member: Francis E. Warren)
 Audit and Control the Contingent Expenses of the Senate (Chairman: John S. Williams; Ranking Member: William P. Dillingham)
 Banking and Currency (Chairman: Robert L. Owen; Ranking Member: Knute Nelson)
 Canadian Relations (Chairman: John K. Shields; Ranking Member: George T. Oliver)
 Census (Chairman: William E. Chilton; Ranking Member: Robert M. La Follette)
 Civil Service and Retrenchment (Chairman: Atlee Pomerene; Ranking Member: Albert B. Cummins)
 Claims (Chairman: Nathan P. Bryan; Ranking Member: Coe I. Crawford)
 Coast and Insular Survey (Chairman: Willard Saulsbury; Ranking Member: Charles E. Townsend)
 Coast Defenses (Chairman: James E. Martine; Ranking Member: Henry A. du Pont)
 Commerce (Chairman: James P. Clarke; Ranking Member: Knute Nelson)
 Conservation of National Resources (Chairman: James K. Vardaman; Ranking Member: Clarence D. Clark)
 Corporations Organized in the District of Columbia (Chairman: Robert M. La Follette; Ranking Member: William J. Stone)
 Cuban Relations (Chairman: Joseph L. Bristow then Oscar Underwood; Ranking Member: N/A)
 Disposition of Useless Papers in the Executive Departments (Chairman: Carroll S. Page; Ranking Member: Harry Lane)
 District of Columbia (Chairman: John W. Smith; Ranking Member: William P. Dillingham)
 Education and Labor (Chairman: Hoke Smith; Ranking Member: William E. Borah)
 Engrossed Bills (Chairman: Francis E. Warren; Ranking Member: Furnifold M. Simmons)
 Enrolled Bills (Chairman: Henry F. Hollis; Ranking Member: Isaac Stephenson)
 Establish a University in the United States (Select) (Chairman: William P. Dillingham; Ranking Member: Lee S. Overman)
 Examine the Several Branches in the Civil Service (Chairman: William A. Smith; Ranking Member: Luke Lea)
 Expenditures in the Department of Agriculture (Chairman: Morris Sheppard; Ranking Member: Henry F. Lippitt)
 Expenditures in the Department of Commerce and Labor (Chairman: William H. Thompson; Ranking Member: Albert B. Fall)
 Expenditures in the Interior Department (Chairman: Reed Smoot; Ranking Member: Claude A. Swanson)
 Expenditures in the Department of Justice (Chairman: George Sutherland; Ranking Member: Key Pittman)
 Expenditures in the Navy Department (Chairman: William Hughes; Ranking Member: Asle Gronna)
 Expenditures in the Post Office Department (Chairman: Blair Lee; Ranking Member: Joseph L. Bristow)
 Expenditures in the Department of State (Chairman: J. Hamilton Lewis; Ranking Member: William P. Jackson)
 Expenditures in the Treasury Department (Chairman: Joseph T. Robinson; Ranking Member: Theodore E. Burton)
 Expenditures in the War Department (Chairman: Miles Poindexter; Ranking Member: Harry Lane)
 Finance (Chairman: Furnifold M. Simmons; Ranking Member: Boies Penrose)
 Fisheries (Chairman: John R. Thornton; Ranking Member: John D. Works)
 Five Civilized Tribes of Indians (Chairman: Knute Nelson; Ranking Member: Benjamin R. Tillman)
 Foreign Relations (Chairman: Augustus O. Bacon; Ranking Member: Henry Cabot Lodge) 
 Forest Reservations and the Protection of Game (Chairman: Harry Lane; Ranking Member: George P. McLean)
 Geological Survey (Chairman: Clarence D. Clark; Ranking Member: John W. Kern)
 Immigration (Chairman: Ellison D. Smith; Ranking Member: Henry Cabot Lodge)
 Indian Affairs (Chairman: William J. Stone; Ranking Member: Moses E. Clapp)
 Indian Depredations (Chairman: William E. Borah; Ranking Member: Claude A. Swanson)
 Industrial Expositions (Chairman: Henry F. Ashurst; Ranking Member: Elihu Root)
 Interoceanic Canals (Chairman: James A. O'Gorman; Ranking Member: Frank B. Brandegee)
 Interstate Commerce (Chairman: Francis G. Newlands; Ranking Member: Moses E. Clapp)
 Irrigation and Reclamation of Arid Lands (Chairman: Marcus A. Smith; Ranking Member: Wesley L. Jones)
 Judiciary (Chairman: Charles A. Culberson; Ranking Member: Clarence D. Clark) 
 Library (Chairman: Luke Lea; Ranking Member: George T. Oliver)
 Manufactures (Chairman: James A. Reed; Ranking Member: George T. Oliver) 
 Military Affairs (Chairman: George E. Chamberlain; Ranking Member: Henry A. du Pont)
 Mines and Mining (Chairman: Thomas J. Walsh; Ranking Member: Miles Poindexter)
 Mississippi River and its Tributaries (Select) (Chairman: Albert B. Cummins; Ranking Member: John Sharp Williams)
 National Banks (Chairman: Charles F. Johnson; Ranking Member: James H. Brady)
 Naval Affairs (Chairman: Benjamin R. Tillman; Ranking Member: George C. Perkins)
 Pacific Islands and Puerto Rico (Chairman: John F. Shafroth; Ranking Member: Miles Poindexter)
 Pacific Railroads (Chairman: Frank B. Brandegee; Ranking Member: Benjamin F. Shively)
 Patents (Chairman: Ollie M. James; Ranking Member: Benjamin R. Tillman)
 Pensions (Chairman: Benjamin F. Shively; Ranking Member: Porter J. McCumber)
 Philippines (Chairman: Gilbert M. Hitchcock; Ranking Member: Joseph L. Bristow)
 Post Office and Post Roads (Chairman: John H. Bankhead; Ranking Member: Boies Penrose)
 Printing (Chairman: Duncan U. Fletcher; Ranking Member: Reed Smoot)
 Private Land Claims (Chairman: Henry Cabot Lodge; Ranking Member: Augustus O. Bacon)
 Privileges and Elections (Chairman: John W. Kern; Ranking Member: William P. Dillingham)
 Public Buildings and Grounds (Chairman: Claude A. Swanson)
 Public Health and National Quarantine (Chairman: Joseph E. Ransdell; Ranking Member: Reed Smoot)
 Public Lands (Chairman: Henry L. Myers; Ranking Member: Reed Smoot)
 Railroads (Chairman: George C. Perkins; Ranking Member: James P. Clarke)
 Revision of the Laws (Chairman: Joseph T. Robinson; Ranking Member: George Sutherland)
 Revolutionary Claims (Chairman: William O. Bradley; Ranking Member: Francis G. Newlands)
 Rules (Chairman: Lee S. Overman; Ranking Member: Francis E. Warren)
 Standards, Weights and Measures (Chairman: Moses E. Clapp; Ranking Member: John H. Bankhead)
 Tariff Regulation (Select)
 Telepost (Select)
 Territories (Chairman: Key Pittman; Ranking Member: Knute Nelson)
 Transportation and Sale of Meat Products (Select) (Chairman: Henry A. du Pont; Ranking Member: Henry F. Hollis)
 Transportation Routes to the Seaboard (Chairman: Porter J. McCumber; Ranking Member: Morris Sheppard)
 Trespassers upon Indian Lands (Select) (Chairman: Isaac Stephenson; Ranking Member: John W. Smith)
 Whole
 Woman Suffrage (Chairman: Charles S. Thomas; Ranking Member: George Sutherland)

House of Representatives

 Accounts (Chairman: James T. Lloyd; Ranking Member: James A. Hughes)
 Agriculture (Chairman: Asbury F. Lever; Ranking Member: Gilbert N. Haugen)
 Alcoholic Liquor Traffic (Chairman: Adolph J. Sabath; Ranking Member: Andrew J. Barchfeld)
 Appropriations (Chairman: John J. Fitzgerald; Ranking Member: Frederick H. Gillett)
 Banking and Currency (Chairman: Carter Glass; Ranking Member: Everis A. Hayes)
 Census (Chairman: Harvey Helm; Ranking Member: Asher C. Hinds)
 Claims (Chairman: Edward W. Pou; Ranking Member: Luther W. Mott)
 Coinage, Weights and Measures (Chairman: Thomas W. Hardwick; Ranking Member: Luther W. Mott)
 Disposition of Executive Papers (Chairman: J. Frederick Cockey Talbott; Ranking Member: Patrick H. Kelley)
 District of Columbia (Chairman: Ben Johnson; Ranking Member: William J. Cary)
 Education (Chairman: Dudley M. Hughes; Ranking Member: James F. Burke)
 Election of the President, Vice President and Representatives in Congress (Chairman: William W. Rucker; Ranking Member: William D. B. Ainey)
 Elections No.#1 (Chairman: James D. Post; Ranking Member: Burton L. French)
 Elections No.#2 (Chairman: James A. Hammil; Ranking Member: William H. Stafford)
 Elections No.#3 (Chairman: Henry M. Goldfogle; Ranking Member: John C. McKenzie)
 Enrolled Bills (Chairman: William A. Ashbrook; Ranking Member: Simeon D. Fess)
 Expenditures in the Agriculture Department (Chairman: Robert L. Doughton; Ranking Member: Charles H. Sloan)
 Expenditures in the Commerce Department (Chairman: John H. Rothermel; Ranking Member: Bird Segle McGuire)
 Expenditures in the Interior Department (Chairman: James M. Graham; Ranking Member: Franklin W. Mondell)
 Expenditures in the Justice Department (Chairman: Robert F. Broussard; Ranking Member: Stephen G. Porter)
 Expenditures in the Labor Department (Chairman: James P. Maher; Ranking Member: Halvor Steenerson)
 Expenditures in the Navy Department (Chairman: Rufus Hardy; Ranking Member: John W. Langley)
 Expenditures in the Post Office Department (Chairman: N/A; Ranking Member: Daniel R. Anthony Jr.)
 Expenditures in the State Department (Chairman: Courtney W. Hamlin; Ranking Member: Willis C. Hawley)
 Expenditures in the Treasury Department (Chairman: Charles O. Lobeck; Ranking Member: Dick Thompson Morgan)
 Expenditures in the War Department (Chairman: John A.M. Adair; Ranking Member: Ernest W. Roberts)
 Expenditures on Public Buildings (Chairman: Thomas F. Konop; Ranking Member: John J. Esch)
 Foreign Affairs (Chairman: Henry D. Flood; Ranking Member: Henry Allen Cooper)
 Immigration and Naturalization (Chairman: John L. Burnett; Ranking Member: Augustus P. Gardner)
 Indian Affairs (Chairman: John H. Stephens; Ranking Member: Charles H. Burke)
 Industrial Arts and Expositions (Chairman: Edwin S. Underhill; Ranking Member: Frank P. Woods)
 Insular Affairs (Chairman: William A. Jones; Ranking Member: Horace M. Towner)
 Interstate and Foreign Commerce (Chairman: William C. Adamson; Ranking Member: Frederick C. Stevens)
 Invalid Pensions (Chairman: Isaac R. Sherwood; Ranking Member: J.N. Langham)
 Irrigation of Arid Lands (Chairman: William R. Smith; Ranking Member: Moses P. Kinkaid)
 Judiciary (Chairman: Henry De Lamar Clayton; Ranking Member: Andrew J. Volstead)
 Labor (Chairman: David J. Lewis; Ranking Member: John M. C. Smith)
 Library (Chairman: James L. Slayden; Ranking Member: Richard Bartholdt)
 Merchant Marine and Fisheries (Chairman: Joshua W. Alexander; Ranking Member: William S. Greene)
 Mileage (Chairman: Warren W. Bailey; Ranking Member: Charles A. Kennedy)
 Military Affairs (Chairman: James Hay; Ranking Member: Julius Kahn)
 Mines and Mining (Chairman: Martin D. Foster; Ranking Member: Joseph Howell)
 Naval Affairs (Chairman: Lemuel P. Padgett; Ranking Member: Thomas S. Butler)
 Patents (Chairman: William A. Oldfield; Ranking Member: Hunter H. Moss Jr.)
 Pensions (Chairman: John A. Key; Ranking Member: Sam R. Sells)
 Post Office and Post Roads (Chairman: John A. Moon; Ranking Member: Samuel W. Smith)
 Printing (Chairman: Henry A. Barnhart; Ranking Member: Edgar R. Kiess)
 Public Buildings and Grounds (Chairman: Henry A. Barnhart; Ranking Member: Richard W. Austin)
 Public Lands (Chairman: Frank Clark; Ranking Member: Irvine L. Lenroot)
 Railways and Canals (Chairman: Martin Dies; Ranking Member: William L. La Follette)
 Reform in the Civil Service (Chairman: Hannibal L. Godwin; Ranking Member: George C. Scott)
 Revision of Laws (Chairman: John T. Watkins; Ranking Member: Edwin A. Merritt)
 Rivers and Harbors (Chairman: Stephen M. Sparkman; Ranking Member: William E. Humphrey)
 Roads (Chairman: Dorsey W. Shackleford; Ranking Member: C. Bascom Slemp)
 Rules (Chairman: Robert L. Henry; Ranking Member: Philip P. Campbell) 
 Standards of Official Conduct
 Territories (Chairman: William C. Houston; Ranking Member: Frank E. Guernsey)
 War Claims (Chairman: Alexander W. Gregg; Ranking Member: Frank Plumley)
 Ways and Means (Chairman: Oscar Underwood; Ranking Member: Sereno E. Payne)
 Whole

Joint committees

 Armor Plant Costs (Special)
 Conditions of Indian Tribes (Special)
 Federal Aid in Construction of Post Roads (Chairman: Sen. Jonathan Bourne Jr.; Vice Chairman: Rep. Dorsey W. Shackleford)
 Disposition of (Useless) Executive Papers
 The Library (Chairman: Sen. John Sharp Williams)
 Interstate Commerce (Chairman: Sen. Francis G. Newlands)
 Investigate the General Parcel Post (Chairman: Sen. Joseph L. Bristow; Vice Chairman: Rep. David E. Finley)
 Printing (Chairman: Sen. Duncan U. Fletcher)
 Postage on 2nd Class Mail Matter and Compensation for Transportation of Mail (Chairman: Sen. Jonathan Bourne Jr.)
 Rural Credits (Chairman: Rep. Carter Glass)
 Second Class Mail Matter and Compensation for Rail Mail Service

Caucuses
 Democratic (House)
 Democratic (Senate)

Employees

Legislative branch agency directors
Architect of the Capitol: Elliott Woods
Librarian of Congress: Herbert Putnam 
Public Printer of the United States: Samuel B. Donnelly, until 1913 
 Cornelius Ford, from 1913

Senate
Secretary: Charles G. Bennett, until March 13, 1913.
James M. Baker, elected March 13, 1913.
Sergeant at Arms: E. Livingston Cornelius, elected December 10, 1912
Charles P. Higgins, elected March 13, 1913
Chaplain: Edward Everett Hale, Unitarian, until March 13, 1913 
 F.J. Prettyman, Methodist, elected March 13, 1913.

House of Representatives
Clerk: South Trimble
Sergeant at Arms: Charles F. Riddell, until April 7, 1913
 Robert B. Gordon, from April 7, 1913
Doorkeeper: Joseph J. Sinnott
Postmaster: William M. Dunbar
Clerk at the Speaker's Table: Bennett C. Clark
Reading Clerks: Patrick Joseph Haltigan (D) and H. Martin Williams (R)
Chaplain: Henry N. Couden, Universalist

See also 
 1912 United States elections (elections leading to this Congress)
 1912 United States presidential election
 1912–13 United States Senate elections
 1912 United States House of Representatives elections
 1914 United States elections (elections during this Congress, leading to the next Congress)
 1914 United States Senate elections
 1914 United States House of Representatives elections

References